Nowdezh (also romanized as Nodej; also known as Nodezh) is a city and capital of Aseminun District, in Manujan County, Kerman Province, Iran.  At the 2016 census, its population was 5,562.

References

Populated places in Manujan County

Cities in Kerman Province